VEC may refer to:

VEC-M1 (Vehículo de Exploración de Caballería), a Spanish Army wheeled reconnaissance vehicle
Vellore Institute of Technology, formally was known as Vellore Engineering College
Victorian Electoral Commission
The Irish Vocational Education Committee
Volunteer Examiner Coordinator, an organization approved to administer amateur radio license examinations in the USA
Veranópolis Esporte Clube Recreativo e Cultural, a Brazilian football (soccer) club
Vermont Electric Cooperative, United States
Ventura (Amtrak station), California, United States; Amtrak station code VEC
Virginia Employment Commission
Virtual Experience Company, a former subsidiary of Blitz Games Studios
Venerable English College, originally a Roman hospice, later a seminary for potential English Catholic priests

See also
Vec (disambiguation)